Tarrama (also known as Khirbet al-Tarramah) is a Palestinian village situated on a hilltop with an elevation of  in the southern West Bank, part of the Hebron Governorate. Located just south of Dura, nearby localities include at-Tabaqa to the north, Fawwar to the east, Khursa to the west, and Deir Razih to the south.

Its total land area is 210 dunams and the village is provided with electricity and telephone lines.

History
Khirbet Tarrama has been suggested as a possible site of the "Jezreel" mentioned as a town in the territory of Judah in the Bible.

Ceramics from the Byzantine era have been found here.

Ottoman era
In 1863, Victor Guérin visited.
In 1883, the PEF's  Survey of Western Palestine (SWP) noted of Khurbet Terrama: "This ruin, not on the map, was found by Guerin about half an hour north of Khurbet Deir Razi. It was on the top of a terraced hill, and contains the remains of an old fort, with caves cut in the rock, one of which is pierced with columbaria."

British Mandate era
At the time of the 1931 census of Palestine,  conducted by the British Mandate authorities,  the population of  Kh. Tarama  was counted under Dura.

Jordanian era
In the wake of the 1948 Arab–Israeli War, and after the 1949 Armistice Agreements,  Tarrama  came under Jordanian rule.

In 1961, there were 161 residents here.

Post-1967
After the Six-Day War in 1967,  Tarrama has been under  Israeli occupation.

During the 1970s, the Israeli Military unsuccessfully attempted to establish a military air field on Tarrama's lands to serve the al-Majnouna camp.

Most of its inhabitants belong to the Awlad Muhammad extended family, but over 10% were Palestinian refugees in 1997.

The population increased to 404 by 1997.

In 2007, Tarrama had a population of 630, according to the Palestinian Central Bureau of Statistics  census.

References

Bibliography

External links
Welcome to Khirbet al-Tarramah 
Tarrama village (fact sheet), Applied Research Institute–Jerusalem (ARIJ) 
Tarrama village profile, ARIJ
 Tarrama aerial photo, ARIJ
The priorities and needs for development in Tarrama village based on the community and local authorities' assessment, ARIJ

Villages in the West Bank